Zakir Hussain Laskar is an All India United Democratic Front politician from Assam. He was elected in Assam Legislative Assembly from Hailakandi in the 2021 Assam Legislative Assembly election.

References

Assam politicians
Year of birth missing (living people)
Living people
People from Hailakandi district
Assam MLAs 2021–2026